American Italian may refer to:
Americans in Italy, a result of emigration from the United States
Italian language in the United States
Italian-American cuisine, a style of Italian cuisine adapted throughout the United States

See also
Italian Americans